The 1905 college baseball season, play of college baseball in the United States began in the spring of 1905.  Play largely consisted of regional matchups, some organized by conferences, and ended in June.  No national championship event was held until 1947.

Conference winners
This is a partial list of conference champions from the 1905 season.

Conference standings
The following is an incomplete list of conference standings:

Award winners

All-Southern team

References